Frostbitten is the tenth novel in Women of the Otherworld series by Kelley Armstrong.

2009 Canadian novels
Novels by Kelley Armstrong
Romantic fantasy novels